Eglantine Wallace, Lady Wallace (née Maxwell; died 28 March 1803), was an 18th-century Scottish author. She was the younger sister of Jane Gordon, Duchess of Gordon.

Biography
Eglantine was the youngest daughter of Sir William Maxwell, 3rd Baronet, of Monreith, Wigtownshire. A boisterous hoyden in her youth, and a woman of violent temper in her maturer years, she was married on 4 September 1770 to Thomas Dunlop, son of John Dunlop of Dunlop and Frances Anna Wallace, the daughter and heiress of Sir Thomas Wallace (1702–1770) of Craigie, fifth and last baronet.

On his grandfather's death in 1770, her husband inherited Craigie, took the surname Wallace, and assumed the style of a baronet; however, the property was deeply indebted, and in 1783 he was obliged to sell all that remained of Craigie. It would seem to have been shortly after this that Eglantine obtained a legal separation, on the ground, it is said, of her husband's cruelty. It is probable that the quarrel was due to pecuniary embarrassment.

A little later Lady Wallace was herself summoned for assaulting a woman—apparently a humble companion—and was directed by the magistrate to compound the matter. Leaving Edinburgh, she seems to have settled in London, but upon her play The Whim (1795) being prohibited the stage by the licenser, she left England in disgust. In October 1789 she was arrested at Paris as an English agent, and narrowly escaped with her life. In 1792 she was in Brussels. There she contracted a friendship with General Charles François Dumouriez, whom in 1793 she entertained in London, where she seems to have been well received in society.

She died at Munich on 28 March 1803, leaving two sons, the elder of whom was General [Sir] John Alexander Dunlop Agnew Wallace.

Selected works
She was author of:
 Letter to a Friend, with a Poem called the Ghost of Werter, 1787, 4to.
 Diamond cut Diamond, a Comedy [from the French], 1787, 8vo. 
 The Ton, a Comedy, 8vo, 1788; it was produced at Covent Garden on 8 April 1788 with a good cast, but, according to John Genest, was "very dull" and a dead failure. 
 The Conduct of the King of Prussia and General Dumouriez, 1793, 8vo; this was followed by a separately issued ‘Supplement.’ 
 Cortes, a Tragedy (?). 
 The Whim, a Comedy, 1795, 8vo. 
 An Address to the People on Peace and Reform, 1798, 8vo.

References

Attribution
 Endnotes:
The Book of Wallace, ed. Rogers (Grampian Club), 1889, i. 87–8;
 Chambers's Traditions of Edinburgh, 1869, p. 229;
 Jones's continuation of Baker's Biographica Dramatica, p. 733, where she is said to have been the wife of Sir James Wallace;
Paterson's History of the Counties of Ayr and Wigton, I. i. 296;
Paterson's Lands and their Owners in Galloway, i. 285;
Autobiogr. of Jane, Duchess of Gordon (Introduction, Gentleman's Magazine 1803, i. 386).
There are several autobiographical notes in The Conduct of the King of Prussia and General Dumouriez.

Year of birth unknown
18th-century births
1803 deaths
18th-century British women writers
18th-century Scottish dramatists and playwrights
18th-century Scottish writers
18th-century Scottish women
Clan Maxwell
Scottish women dramatists and playwrights
Scottish women writers
Wives of baronets